The FIA ecoRally Cup is an international motorsport competition for electric vehicles organized by the Fédération Internationale de l'Automobile. The cup consists of several regularity rallies, usually located in Europe and ran during one calendar year. Vehicles must be unmodified production road vehicles, although prototypes may be permitted subject to FIA approval if they are road legal within the European Union.

The cup replaced a series of FIA competitions based around vehicles developed with alternative energy propulsion and included various energy sources and propulsion methods. It was originally known as Alternative Energies Cup (AEC) until 2016. From 2017 to 2021 it was known as E-Rally Regularity Cup (ERRC), and was part of the FIA Electric and New Energy Championship (ENEC) until 2020 along with the Solar Cup and E-Karting.

Champions

FIA ecoRally Cup (2022-)

FIA E-Rally Regularity Cup (2017-2021)

FIA ERRC Consumption Cup (2019)

FIA Alternative Energies Cup

Category VII: Hybrid and other vehicles (2007-2016)

FIA AEC – Category III: Pure electric vehicles (2007-2016)

Category I: Solar powered vehicles and Olympia Class

References

External links

FIA Alternative Energies Cup
Rallye Monte Carlo
Clean Week 2020
Rally Reykjavik
EcoRallye Vasco Navarro
Hi-Tech EkoMobilty Rally
EcoTarga Florio
Rallye vert de Montréal
Ecorally San Marino – Città del Vaticano

 FIA ecoRally Cup